Alex Taylor (born 24 January 1936) was a Canadian politician. He served in the Legislative Assembly of Saskatchewan from 1971 to 1975, as a NDP member for the constituency of Kerrobert–Kindersley. He is a clergyman, born in Glasgow, Scotland.

References

Served as Minister of Social Services and Minister responsible for the Public Service Commission 1972-1975

Saskatchewan New Democratic Party MLAs
1936 births
Living people
Politicians from Glasgow
Scottish emigrants to Canada
Members of the Executive Council of Saskatchewan